The monastery of Santa Maria del Roure, referred to as  El Roure by locals, is a ruined monastery to the northwest of Pont de Molins (Alt Empordà, Catalonia) at the top of the Serra dels Tramonts. Mostly Gothic-era portions of the building are preserved. Dedicated to the Virgin Mary, the various names of the sanctuary -Santa Maria del Roure, Canònica de Santa Maria del Roure, Monastery of Santa Maria del Roure, or according to the Cartographic Institute of Catalonia: Mare de Déu del Roure- date from the 11th or early 12th century. This building is indexed in the Catalan heritage register as Bé Cultural d'Interès Local (BCIL) under the reference IPA-19985.

Bibliography 
 Del Campo and Jordan Ferran (2000). Set segles d'una família empordanesa, els Jordà de Molins. Figueras BRAU editions.  (in Catalan).
 Vivas Llorens, Edward (1992). Guerra Gran, la batalla del Roure i el seu santuari pp. 109-148. Annals of the Institute of Empordanesos, 25. (in Catalan).
 Volume 3 (2005). El Meu País, tots els pobles, viles i ciutats de Catalunya. Barcelona, Editions 62.  (in Catalan).

External links

Christian monasteries in Spain
Christian monasteries established in the 11th century
Church ruins in Spain
Monasteries in Catalonia
Alt Empordà